Alyaksandr Dzyameshka (born 7 November 1986) is a Belarusian football coach who as assistant coach in Rukh Brest.

Honours
Dinamo Brest
Belarusian Cup winner: 2006–07, 2016–17, 2017–18

External links
 
 

1986 births
Living people
Belarusian footballers
Association football midfielders
FC Dynamo Brest players
FC Granit Mikashevichi players
FC Gorodeya players
FC Rukh Brest players
Sportspeople from Brest, Belarus